The Papuan pitta (Erythropitta macklotii) is a species of pitta. It was formerly considered a subspecies of the red-bellied pitta.  It is found in the Aru Islands, New Guinea and the northern Cape York Peninsula.  Its natural habitat is subtropical or tropical moist lowland forest.  It is threatened by habitat loss.

Gallery

References

Papuan pitta
Birds of New Guinea
Papuan pitta